Wadi Degla Sporting Club (Women) is an Egyptian women's football club based in Cairo. The club is related to Wadi Degla Holding, a construction company established in 1994.

The club has won the Egyptian Women's Premier League on a record 12 times. The club is the affiliated to men's team of Wadi Degla SC who have been playing in the Egyptian Premier League since  2009–10 season.

Players

Current squad

Honours

Domestic 
League titles

 Egyptian Women's Premier League

 Winners (record) (12): 2008, 2009, 2010, 2012, 2013, 2014, 2015, 2016, 2017, 2018, 2020, 2021

 Egyptian Women's Cup

 Winners  (2): 2010, 2016–17

See also 
 Wadi Degla SC

 Egyptian Women's Premier League

References

External links 

 Wadi Degla Women  on Instagram

Women's football clubs in Egypt
Wadi Degla SC
Football clubs in Cairo